"Inner Ninja" is a song by Canadian hip hop recording artist Classified, featuring David Myles. It was released in November 2012 as the lead single from his album, Classified. The song reached number 5 in Canada and was certified 5× Platinum.
The organizers of the 2015 Pan American Games licensed the Inner Ninja to serve as the theme song for Pachi the porcupine, the Games' sports mascot.

Music videos
The original version of the video shows two men taking a bag of sweets from a young boy who then turns into a ninja and chases after them. The boy and two other children dressed as ninjas finally catch up with the men and defeat them and reclaim the bag of sweets. Throughout the video it also shows Classified and Myles singing next to a group of children learning martial arts.

Classified featuring Olly Murs remix version

On 10 November 2013, a new version of the song was released, this time featuring vocals from English singer Olly Murs. This version has charted in New Zealand.

Music video
The second video which was released on 30 September 2013 is similar to the first except it features clips of Murs dressed in black clothing in a Japanese-themed room.

Charts and certifications

Weekly charts
Classified featuring David Myles version

Classified featuring Olly Murs Remix version

Year-end charts

Certifications

References

2012 singles
2013 singles
Olly Murs songs
2012 songs